The European Volleyball Confederation ( or CEV) is the continental governing body for the sports of indoor volleyball, beach volleyball, and snow volleyball in Europe. Its headquarters is located in Luxembourg City, Luxembourg.

Profile
Although the CEV was formed on 21 October 1963, in Bucharest, Romania volleyball became popular in Europe many years before. The majority of the teams that attended the Congress which eventually led to the foundation of the FIVB in 1947 were from this continent. In fact, the foundation itself is supposed to have been a move on the part of European national federations.

Volleyball was invented in the United States, but became for the first time an extremely popular sport in eastern Europe, after being introduced by American soldiers during World War I. By the middle of the century, it had already spread through the rest of the continent as well. Many techniques and tactics that are commonplace in modern volleyball have been allegedly introduced by European teams. Amongst others, it would be worthy of note here: blocking (Czechoslovakia, 1938); penetration of the setter, which eventually led to the development of the so-called 5-1 system (Soviet Union, 1949); forearm pass (Czechoslovakia, 1958); and backrow attack (Poland, 1974).

The long and significant tradition of the sport in the continent may at least partially account for the administrative structure employed by the CEV, which rivals the FIVB's in size and comprehensiveness. It is the biggest of all volleyball confederations, and the one that organizes the largest number of annual competitions and tournaments. As of 2005, its headquarters are located in Luxembourg.

As the presiding entity over European volleyball federations, the CEV organizes continental competitions such as the prestigious European Championship (first edition, 1948), the CEV Cup and the European League. It participates in the organization of qualification tournaments for major events such as the Olympic Games or the men's and women's world championships, and of international competitions hosted by one of its affiliated federations.

The CEV family increased its membership to 56 Federations following the approval of Kosovo on the opening day of the 35th FIVB World Congress held on 5 October 2016, in Buenos Aires, Argentina.

In response to the 2022 Russian invasion of Ukraine, the European Volleyball Confederation banned all Russian national teams, clubs, and officials from participating in European competition, and suspended all members of Russia from their respective functions in CEV organs. It also canceled all competitions in Russia.

Affiliated federations
As of 2022, the following 56 national federations were affiliated to the CEV. The nations are listed alphabetically.

Note:

Possible member federations in the future: Åland, Guernsey, the Isle of Man, Jersey, Svalbard, and Vatican City.

FIVB World Rankings

National team competitions

Indoor volleyball
 Men's European Volleyball Championship
 Women's European Volleyball Championship
 Men's European Volleyball League
 Women's European Volleyball League
 European Games
 Men's U22 Volleyball European Championship
 Women's U22 Volleyball European Championship
 Men's Junior European Volleyball Championship
 Women's Junior European Volleyball Championship
 Boys' Youth European Volleyball Championship
 Girls' Youth European Volleyball Championship
 Boys' U17 European Volleyball Championship
 Girls' U16 European Volleyball Championship

Beach volleyball
 European Beach Volleyball Championships
 European Beach Volleyball Tour
 European U22 Beach Volleyball Championships (U23 until 2013)
 European U20 Beach Volleyball Championships
 European U18 Beach Volleyball Championships

Snow volleyball
 European Snow Volleyball Championships
 European Snow Volleyball Tour

Clubs competitions

Men
 CEV Champions League
 CEV Cup
 CEV Challenge Cup

Women
 CEV Women's Champions League
 Women's CEV Cup
 CEV Women's Challenge Cup

Zonal associations
The CEV has been divided into six zonal associations which are largely geographically based:

Balkan Volleyball Association (BVA) – 11 national federations
Eastern European Volleyball Zonal Association (EEVZA) – 10 national federations
Middle European Volleyball Zonal Association (MEVZA) – 8 national federations
North European Volleyball Zonal Association (NEVZA) – 8 national federations*
Western European Volleyball Zonal Association (WEVZA) – 8 national federations
Small Countries Association (SCA) – 14 national federations*

Note:

* The Faroe Islands, Greenland, and Iceland are members of both the North European Volleyball Zonal Association and the Small Countries Association.

Sponsors

References

External links

 

Fédération Internationale de Volleyball confederations
Volleyball organizations
Volleyball
Volleyball in Europe
Sports organizations established in 1963
1963 establishments in Romania